More Fire is an album by reggae and dancehall artist Capleton, released in 2000. The album is a mix of dancehall and reggae, and contains the hit singles "Who Dem" and "Jah Jah City".

The album peaked at No. 3 on the Billboard Reggae Albums chart.

Critical reception
AllMusic called the album "a tight package of sizzling beats and thought-provoking poetry."

Track listing

References

2000 albums
Capleton albums